Mežvidi Parish is an administrative unit of Ludza Municipality in the Latgale region of Latvia.

Towns, villages and settlements of Mežvidi Parish 
  – parish administrative center

References 

Parishes of Latvia
Ludza Municipality
Latgale